Atrophaneura kuehni is a species of butterfly from the family Papilionidae. It is found on Sulawesi, Indonesia.

The male's dorsal side is black overall, the ventral side has a red patch. The female is brown with markings paler than the male.

Little is known about the status of this butterfly which may be very rare. It is held in very few museum collections.

References

External links
Global Butterfly Information System text and images of syntype

Butterflies described in 1886
Atrophaneura
Butterflies of Indonesia